John Trollope may refer to:

 John Trollope, 1st Baron Kesteven (1800–1874), former President of the Poor Law Board
 John Lightfoot Trollope (1897–1958), British First World War flying ace
 John Trollope (footballer) (born 1943), association football player